The Pine State Creamery is a former dairy products factory in Raleigh, North Carolina.  It is a Moderne style building, built in 1928.  It is a two-story, five bay by six bay, flat-roofed reinforced concrete building in cream-colored brick.  It features a crenellated parapet at the roofline and a three-story corner tower.  Additions were made to the original building in the 1940s and 1960s.  The building has been converted to office and retail functions.

It was listed on the National Register of Historic Places in 1997 and is a Raleigh Historic Landmark.

References

Industrial buildings and structures on the National Register of Historic Places in North Carolina
Industrial buildings completed in 1928
Buildings and structures in Raleigh, North Carolina
Dairy products companies of the United States
1928 establishments in North Carolina
National Register of Historic Places in Raleigh, North Carolina